Edward Warner may refer to:

Edward Warner (1511–1565), MP for Great Grimsby, Grantham and Norfolk
Edward Warner (1818–1875), Lieutenant of the Tower of London, and MP for Norwich
 Edward Warner (VC) (1883–1915), English recipient of the Victoria Cross (VC)
Edward Pearson Warner (1894-1958), American aviator
Ed Warner (1889–1954), American baseball player
Ed Warner (basketball) (1929–2002),  American college basketball player
Eddie Warner, see Movies for the Blind

See also